The 2016 Winston-Salem mayoral election was held on November 8, 2016 to elect the mayor of Winston-Salem, North Carolina. It saw the reelection of Allen Joines.

This election saw mayoral elections in Winston-Salem shift from odd-numbered years to presidential election years.

General election

References 

Winston-Salem
Mayoral elections in Winston-Salem, North Carolina
Winston-Salem